was a Japanese novelist and screenwriter.

Prizes
Fujita was the 125th recipient of the Naoki Prize in 2001

Novels
 Adrift in Tokyo (Japanese title 転々, tenten)
 A Laughing Frog (Warau Kaeru)
 Territory of Love (愛の領分)

Screenwriting
 Adrift in Tokyo (Japanese title 転々, tenten) (2007)
 Shikyū no Kioku (2007)
 Senryokugai Tsūkoku (2009)

Personal life
Fujita was married to fellow Naoki Prize winning novelist Mariko Koike from 1984 until his death in 2020.

References

External links
 J'Lit | Authors : Yoshinaga Fujita | Books from Japan 

1950 births
2020 deaths
21st-century Japanese novelists
Japanese crime fiction writers
Mystery Writers of Japan Award winners